Mieczysław Łomowski (19 September 1914, in Vilna – 15 October 1969, near Gniew) was a Polish shot putter who competed in the 1948 Summer Olympics.

He died in a car accident near Gniew.

References

1914 births
1969 deaths
Polish male shot putters
Polish athletics coaches
Olympic athletes of Poland
Athletes (track and field) at the 1948 Summer Olympics
Sportspeople from Vilnius
People from Vilensky Uyezd
People from the Russian Empire of Polish descent
Road incident deaths in Poland
Lechia Gdańsk athletes